The Angola women's national handball team, nicknamed As Pérolas (The Pearls), represents Angola in international handball competitions.

History
Angola became a member of the African Handball Confederation in 1980.

Summer Olympics
Angola participated in six editions of the olympic games since 1996, namely in 1996, 2000, 2004, 2008, 2012 and 2016, having ranked 7th in 1996.

World Championship
Angola participated in 14 editions of the world cup since 1990, namely in 1990, 1993, 1995, 1997, 1999, 2001, 2003, 2005, 2007, 2009, 2011, 2013, 2015 and 2017. It has notably ranked 7th in 2007 and 8th in 2011.

Results

World Championship

Summer Olympics

African Championship

African Games

Other competitions
2015 Angola 40 Years Tournament – 
2019 Carpathian Trophy –

Team

Current squad
Squad for the 2021 World Women's Handball Championship.

Head coach: Filipe Cruz

Angola all-time record against all nations

See also
Angola women's junior national handball team
Angola women's youth national handball team

References

External links
IHF profile

National team
Angola
H